Transformers: Animated is an American superhero animated television series based on the Transformers toy line. It was produced by Cartoon Network Studios and Hasbro Entertainment and animated by The Answer Studio, Mook Animation, and Studio 4°C (shorts). The series debuted on Cartoon Network on December 26, 2007, and ended on May 23, 2009; running for 42 episodes across three seasons. In Japan, the show debuted on April 3, 2010, on both TV Aichi and TV Tokyo.

The show is set in its own stand-alone continuity, separate from any other previous Transformers continuities. Despite this, the series features many references to the other continuities; such as footage from the Generation 1 series being used as a historical film.

Synopsis

Series overview
The series began with a three-part movie-length episode called "Transform and Roll Out!". Stellar cycles (years) after the Autobots won the great war for Cybertron against the Decepticons, an Autobot maintenance crew led by Optimus Prime and consisting of Ratchet, Bulkhead, Prowl, and Bumblebee discover the legendary AllSpark buried on an asteroid. The Autobots take the AllSpark back to their ship, but are soon confronted by a crew of Decepticons led by the notorious warlord Megatron and consisting of Blitzwing, Lugnut, Blackarachnia, and Starscream. Megatron attacks the Autobot ship and tries to retrieve the AllSpark, but when an explosive planted on Megatron by the treacherous Starscream detonates, the ship crashes on Earth. The Autobots go into stasis to survive the crash, while the scattered remains of Megatron are discovered by a human scientist named Isaac Sumdac.

Half a century later, Professor Issac Sumdac is the CEO of a robotics company known as Sumdac Systems, which is based in a futuristic version of Detroit in the 2050s. Optimus Prime and the Autobots awaken from stasis and defend the people of Detroit from a monster, resulting in them becoming local celebrities. They befriend Professor Sumdac's young daughter Sari, who teaches them about Earth customs, and whose security card is transformed into a metallic toll which possesses a fraction of the AllSpark's vast cosmic power. Starscream arrives on Earth and tries to take the all-powerful AllSpark for himself, but the Autobots successfully stop him and save the Earth once again.

Season One
The Autobots settle into their new home and learn about Earth culture and customs, all of the while defending Detroit from various threats. Megatron's disembodied head, which has been in Professor Sumdac's laboratory since the ship crashed, comes back online and manipulates Sumdac into building him a new body, pretending that he is an Autobot. Blitzwing and Lugnut arrive on Earth searching for Megatron, while Blackarachnia targets Optimus Prime, blaming him for her techno-organic mutation. New Transformers introduced in the first season include the Autobot Arcee (who only appears in Ratchet's flashbacks), the Decepticon Soundwave, the bounty-hunter Lockdown, and the Dinobots Grimlock, Snarl, and Swoop. Several human villains are also introduced, including Nanosec (who can run at extreme speeds), the Headmaster (who pilots a machine that attaches to and controls large robots) and Meltdown (who is covered in a toxic and corrosive substance). The season ends with Megatron returning with a new body (built by the all-powerful AllSpark from his old body, while also killing Starscream for his betrayal), and the AllSpark exploding into many fragments that scatter across Detroit.

Season Two 
The Autobot Elite Guard members Ultra Magnus, Sentinel Prime, and Jazz arrive on Earth to retrieve the AllSpark, only to learn of its destruction in the Season One finale. While Sentinel completely disbelieves Optimus's claims, Optimus and his team are eventually able to convince Magnus of Decepticon activity on Earth. The main theme for Season Two is the discovery of small fragments of the AllSpark littered across the city (and possibly, the entire planet), while the Decepticons work on building a space bridge back to Cybertron with the help of Issac Sumdac, who was kidnapped by Megatron in the previous season's finale. This is part of Megatron's plan to invade Cybertron from within, without the Autobots' awareness. 

New characters introduced in season 2 include the Autobots Omega Supreme (who was revealed to be Optimus Prime's team's spaceship), Wreck-Gar, Wasp and Blurr, the Decepticons Shockwave, Swindle, Mixmaster and Scrapper, the human villain Slo-Mo (who is able to slow down time using a watch embedded with an AllSpark fragment), and Starscream's army of clones Thundercracker, Ramjet, Skywarp, Sunstorm, and Slipstream (none of the clones are openly referred to by name in the series, the names listed come from the toy-line, while Slipstream was retroactively given her name by Hasbro). At the end of the season, the Decepticon Space Bridge is destroyed, but Megatron, Starscream (resurrected by the AllSpark fragment in his forehead), and Omega Supreme are sucked through and lost in deep space. Sari meanwhile, notices an injury that exposes mechanical components under her skin, revealing that she is not entirely human.

Season Three
Sari is shocked and distraught over the revelation that she is a robot, and instantly assumes that her "father" had actually built her, refusing to believe Sumdac's claim that he discovered her as a small liquid metal body (protoform). Upon examining Sari, Ratchet discovers something quite jarring; Sari is essentially human, but also part Cybertronian. Prowl does some research and discovers that Professor Sumdac was in fact telling the truth, and deduces that Sari is a Cybertronian protoform (the early development stage of all Cybertronians) that came into contact with Sumdac's genetic information. Sari later uses the great power from her Key to upgrade herself into an armored techno-organic teenage form that is far  taller and much stronger; (similar to Kamen Rider & Super Sentai/Power Rangers) equipped with several powerful weaponry and unique cybertronian abilities.

Meanwhile, on Cybertron, Shockwave (disguised as the Autobot Longarm Prime) sabotages several Elite Guard operations in preparation for Megatron's return, unaware that Megatron and Starscream are lost in deep space, trying to gain control of Omega Supreme. Suspecting that the double-agent may be the escaped convict Wasp, Ultra Magnus sends Sentinel and Jazz back to Earth to find and apprehend Wasp, who has found his way to Earth to exact revenge on Bumblebee for framing him. Soundwave and Arcee reappear, with Soundwave being accompanied by minions Laserbeak and Ratbat.  New characters introduced in season 3 include the Constructicon Dirt Boss, the Autobot scientist Perceptor, Prowl's mentor Yoketron (who only appears in flashbacks of his most promising student Prowl), and the flying Elite Guard members Jetstorm and Jetfire.

In the two-part finale, "Endgame", Jazz joins Optimus Prime's team on Earth, while Megatron and Starscream also find their way back to Earth, using information stored deep within Arcee's subconscious mind to create an army of Omega Supreme-sized robots in Lugnut's likeness. Optimus defeats Megatron with the aid of Ultra Magnus' Magnus Hammer (which destroys Megatron's fusion cannon) and a "Wingblade" jetpack built by Professor Sumdac, Ratchet, and Sari while Prowl sacrifices his own vital Spark to reassemble most of the AllSpark into what resembles the Matrix of Leadership, killing Starscream in the process, and destroying the "Lugnut Supremes" all at once. Megatron is arrested, and the Autobots return to Cybertron, and are hailed as heroes upon arriving on their home world with Sari who is intent on learning what is to be an Autobot and finally learn about her unique origins.

Season Four
A fourth season of more than thirteen/sixteen episodes was initially planned for, consisting of more than just the regular thirteen or sixteen episodes, but was ultimately cancelled. According to The AllSpark Almanac II, The Complete AllSpark Almanac, and issue #71 of the Transformers Collectors' Club magazine, season four's main theme would have been the discovery of Energon deposits left by the Allspark across Detroit. Various ideas planned for the much longer cancelled fourth season include:
 Optimus Prime, Bumblebee, Jazz and Ratchet returning to Earth along with new team member Ironhide, who would scan a pick-up truck vehicle mode resembling the live-action film version of the character while retaining elements from his Generation 1 counterpart.
 Sari remaining on Cybertron to discover more about her unique origins and the Cybertronian species while being educated by Arcee, and training in the Autobot boot camp under Kup alongside Nightbeat, an aspiring detective sharing Arcee's body-type; Hosehead, a Canadian-accented Autobot sharing Sentinel's body-type; and Siren, a sonic-mouthed Autobot who wears the common body-type employed by Bumblebee. These three young Autobots previously appeared in the follow-up story "The Return of Blurr", in which they helped Sari and Arcee with stopping an ancient Decepticon weapon named Kremzeek and restoring Blurr, who was compacted into a cube by Shockwave in the third season.
 Bulkhead also remaining on Cybertron to defend Energon farms from Decepticons such Strika's Team Chaar, who would acquire four new members: Mindwipe, a hypnotist capable of interacting with deceased Decepticons; Blot, who would turn from a monster-motif robot based on his Generation 1 Terrorcon counterpart's beast mode into a Cybertronian ground vehicle; Sky-Byte, a poet inspired by the Predacon from the 2001 Robots in Disguise anime who shares a body-type with Lugnut; and Dr. Scalpel, Oil Slick's partner who is heavily inspired by his Live-action counterpart from Revenge of the Fallen.
 Megatron reformatting into a new Triple-Changer body, with his new vehicle modes being a Cybertronian fighter jet and tank. An action figure was designed for Megatron's new body under the name "Marauder Megatron", but only a prototype exists. He would also have broken out of Trypticon Prison on Cybertron and relocate the city of Kaon to Earth, using the Energon deposits to build machinations that could threaten all life on the planet.
 Hot Shot, who made minor appearances in the third season, acquiring an Earth mode of a sports car. Like Megatron's Marauder body, an action figure was designed for Hot Shot's new body, but only a prototype exists.
 Optimus reformatting into a new "Powermaster" body in which he can combine with his trailer to be of equal power and stature to Megatron. Concept art for an action figure of this body mas been made, which also includes a Mini-Con that would plug into him.
 Blackarachnia returning with an army of Predacons, including Waspinator, new recruits Inferno and Antagony, and a failed clone experiment named Primal Major. She would also adopt a new color scheme heavily based on her Beast Wars counterpart. A flashback episode would reveal the circumstances of her siding with the Decepticons.
 Starscream would have been revived by Slipstream.
 Bulkhead and Sari entering a parallel "Shattered Glass" universe with evil Autobots and heroic Decepticons (a homage to the Shattered Glass comic).
 Minicons from Kaon disabling all the machinery in Detroit (a homage to the film Gremlins), with Ratchet and Captain Fanzone being the ones to stop them.
 The Autobot Cosmos, who made minor appearances in the third season, playing a major role as a messenger for Optimus and scanning a prop flying saucer from the set of a B-Movie.
 Slipstream leading her own team of Decepticons on Earth before ultimately becoming an ally to the Autobots.
 Lugnut, Blitzwing, Shockwave, Sunstorm, Ramjet, and the Stunticons, who were captured by Sideswipe and Cheetor in the follow-up comic "The Stunti-Con Job", would all take part in a spectacular prison break. Thundercracker, Skywarp, Soundwave, Laserbeak, and Meltdown would all return as well.
 Mixmaster and Dirt Boss returning, reuniting with Scrapper. Dirt Boss would put Scrapper, Mixmaster, and Skipjack-a new Constructicon cloned from the Autobot Erector-to work on a project called "Devastator". They would also battle the other Decepticons over control of the Energon deposits on Earth.
 The Decepticon Bludgeon appearing as a skeletal pirate-motif robot rather than having a skeletal samurai-motif.
 Sentinel creating the Powermaster weapon while fighting for his Magnus status and attempting to vanquish Megatron using the transformed AllSpark/Matrix, only to fail miserably 
 Prowl's essence inhabiting AllSpark-powered Cybertronians- Wreck-Gar, Slipstream and Mixmaster- and warning Optimus of the consequences of Sentinel's further misguided actions.
 A new group of human villains called S.T.E.A.M. (short for Saving The Earth And Mankind), who are against modern technology and use Steampunk-style weaponry.
 Bumblebee solving a mystery which sees himself, Bulkhead, Ironhide, and Sentinel, as well as the newly techno-organic Waspinator and former "Autobot" Longarm/Shockwave, being targeted.
 Rattletrap being targeted by Autobots and Decepticons alike while being stranded on Earth.
Blackarachnia somehow getting cured and returning to being the Autobot Elita 1 again
What becomes of the Deception Swindle. 
Reappearance of secondary, minor human villains Slomo, Nanosec, Angry Archer, Professor Princess and even Meltdown.
Megatron almost succeeding in reformatting Earth into a planet for the Decepticons which leads to an alliance between the Autobots, other Decepticons and the Predacons, Sari developing new and more powerful Cybertronian abilities and weaponry, and discovering her unusual mental connection to the AllSpark itself and a certain all-powerful Cybertronian entity (Primus), ending in and a final battle against a brand new ancient foe who is even mightier than Megatron.

Episodes

Characters 

The main Autobots are Optimus Prime, Prowl, Ratchet, Bulkhead, and Bumblebee. The main Decepticon cast is made up of Megatron, Starscream, Blitzwing, Lugnut, and Blackarachnia. The main humans, or as the Transformers call them, "organics", are Professor Isaac Sumdac, Sari Sumdac, and Captain Fanzone.

Comic adaptation 
Transformers Animated was adapted into comics and published by IDW Publishing in 2008. The book used cartoon screen captures arranged in comic book style panels. In the same year, they also published a comic series featuring original stories titled Transformers Animated: The Arrival. In Japan, a manga adaptation titled  was created by Naoto Tsushima and serialized in Kadokawa Shoten's Kerokero Ace magazine from March 26, 2010 to March 26, 2011.

Production 
The series is animated by Japanese animation studios MOOK DLE, The Answer Studio, and Studio 4°C. Formerly known by the working title Transformers: Heroes, its new simplified title was designed to specifically distinguish it from the live-action film released in July 2007, months before the first episode aired. The series is distributed internationally by Entertainment Rights.

The show's supervising director is Matt Youngberg (Teen Titans, The Batman), with Cartoon Network vice-president Sam Register, who also created Hi Hi Puffy AmiYumi, as an executive producer and Vincent Aniceto as a line producer. Additionally, Beast Machines writer Marty Isenberg returned as the head writer for this series. Art director and lead character designer Derrick J. Wyatt (Teen Titans, Ben 10: Omniverse, and Scooby-Doo! Mystery Incorporated) created the controversial "brand new look" that this series introduces.

The first episode was due to be screened in full on November 3–4, 2007, at the NTFA Mini-Con, a Transformers convention in Arlöv, Sweden, but US toymaker Hasbro pulled their approval of the screening of the full episode, despite it being green-lighted by Hasbro Nordic at first. The episode had to be cut down to the first 11 minutes.

Japanese version 
While Transformers Animated had aired and completed its run in many other territories, the release of the series in Japan had been delayed. However, on December 18, 2009, it was announced through the launch of the official website that Takara Tomy would be bringing the series to Japan come Spring 2010. Later, TV Aichi confirmed the exact date of broadcast, which was April 3, 2010, at 8:00AM on the TV Tokyo Network. The website had launched with very little content available, with a trailer and wallpaper of Optimus Prime, later with adding Bumblebee media. As with the movie when released in Japan, Takara Tomy is not renaming Optimus to Convoy as they have done in past properties. However, in a solicitation preview of the key chains, Bulkhead was renamed as Ironhide in toy version.

The Japanese opening theme is "TRANSFORMERS EVO." performed by JAM Project, while the ending theme is "AXEL TRANSFORMERS" by Rey.

Cast

Main cast 
 Jeff Bennett – Prowl, Ultra Magnus, Soundwave, Mixmaster, Grandus, Captain Fanzone, Angry Archer
 Corey Burton - Ratchet, Megatron, Shockwave, Ironhide, Spike Witwicky, Cyrus "The Colossus" Rhodes, Cyclonus, Brawn
 Bill Fagerbakke – Bulkhead, Hotshot, Master Disaster
 David Kaye – Optimus Prime, Grimlock, Lugnut, Highbrow, Cliffjumper, Warpath, Sparkplug Witwicky (Season 2)
 Tom Kenny – Starscream, Scrapper, Wasp/Waspinator, Jetfire, Skywarp, Sunstorm, Thundercracker, Ramjet, Rattletrap, Professor Isaac Sumdac, Tutor Bot
 Bumper Robinson – Bumblebee, Blitzwing, Blackout, Porter C. Powell, Sparkplug Witwicky (Season 1)
 Tara Strong – Sari Sumdac, Red Alert, Strika, Slipstream, Teletraan I, Mayor Edsel's Aide, Daniel, Carly, Slo-Mo, Receptionist Bot
 Cree Summer – Blackarachnia/Elita One

Additional voices 
 Susan Blu  – Arcee, Flareup
 Townsend Coleman – Sentinel Prime, Tracks
 Lance Henriksen – Lockdown
 Phil LaMarr – Jazz, Oil Slick, Omega Supreme (Season 3), Jetstorm, Alpha Trion
 John Mariano – Dirt Boss, Sparkplug Witwicky (Season 3)
 John Moschitta, Jr. – Blurr
 Judd Nelson – Rodimus Prime
 Alexander Polinsky – Henry Masterson/Headmaster
 Brian Posehn – Nino Sexton/Nanosec
 Kevin Michael Richardson – Omega Supreme (Season 2)
 Kath Soucie – Professor Princess, Trisha
 Peter Stormare – Prometheus Black/Meltdown
 George Takei – Yoketron
 Fred Willard – Swindle
 "Weird Al" Yankovic – Wreck-Gar

Crew 
 Susan Blu – Casting Director and Recording Director
 Marty Isenberg – Story Editor
 Matt Youngberg – Supervising Producer
 Sebastian Evans – Composer

Home video releases

North America 
The North American releases feature full-screen video and stereo sound in both English and Spanish (except Season Three and The Complete Series (both feature widescreen video and stereo sound in only English)).
 Transform and Roll Out (DVD, June 17, 2008)
 A single DVD containing the feature-length premiere "Transform and Roll Out".
 Also includes the first two unaired shorts, "Career Day" and "Evel Knievel Jump".
 A Target exclusive version came with a second disc containing the follow-up episode "Home Is Where the Spark Is".
 Season One (DVD, August 19, 2008)
 A two-disc set containing the complete first season, from "Home Is Where the Spark Is" to "Megatron Rising Part II".
 Also includes a season 2 "sneak peek" photo gallery.
 Season Two (DVD, January 6, 2009)
 A two-disc set containing the complete second season, from "The Elite Guard" to "A Bridge to Close Part II", with audio commentary on selected episodes.
 Also includes the shorts "Starscream Heckles Megatron" and "Explosive Punch" and a photo gallery.
 Season Three and The Complete Series (DVD, June 10, 2014)
 Shout! Factory released the third season on DVD on June 10 as well as the complete series afterwards.

United Kingdom 
Whereas in North America the series was released in complete seasons, the UK instead got several single-disc "volumes" containing four episodes each, also featuring full-screen video, but with audio and subtitles in English and German.
 Transform and Roll Out (DVD, August 4, 2008)
 Contains the feature-length premiere "Transform and Roll Out" and the shorts "Career Day" and "Evel Knievel Jump".
 Volume One: Blast from the Past (DVD, October 20, 2008)
 Contains episodes 4 Home Is Where the Spark Is, 5 Total Meltdown, 6 Blast From the Past and 7 Thrill of the Hunt
 Volume Two: Lost and Found (DVD, June 15, 2009)
 Contains episodes 8 Nanosac, 9 Along Came a Spider, 10 Sound and Fury, 11 Lost and Found
 Volume Three: Megatron Rising (DVD, June 15, 2009)
 Contains episodes 12 Survival of the Fittest, 13 Headmaster, 14 Nature Calls 15 Megatron Rising Part 1 and 16 Megatron Rising Part 2
 Volume Four: Mission Accomplished (DVD, June 15, 2009)
 Contains episodes 17 The Elite Guard, 18 Return of the Headmaster, 19 Mission Accomplished and 20 Garbage In, Garbage Out
 Volume Five: Fistful of Energon (DVD, September 3, 2009)
 Contains episodes 21 Velocity, 22 Rise of the Constructicons, 23 A Fistful of Energon and 24 S.U.V - Society of Ultimate Villany
 Volume Six: Black Friday (DVD, November 5, 2009)
 Contains episodes 25 Autoboot Camp, 26 Black Friday, 27 Sari, No One's Home, 28 A Bridge Too Close, Part 1 and 29 A Bridge Too Close, Part 2

Germany 
Germany saw the same releases as the UK.
 Transformieren und Abfahrt (English: Transform and Roll Out) (DVD, September 10, 2008)
 Contains the feature-length premiere "Transform and Roll Out" and the shorts "Career Day" and "Evel Knievel Jump".
 Volume Eins: Drachenkämpfer (English: Dragon fighter(s)) (DVD, October 13, 2008)
 Contains the episodes "Home Is Where the Spark Is" through to "The Thrill of the Hunt".
 Volume Zwei: Die alten Waffen (English: The old weapons) (DVD, March 12, 2009)
 Contains the episodes "Nanosec" through to "Lost and Found".
 Volume Drei: Megatrons Auferstehung (English: Megatron's Resurrection) (DVD, June 4, 2009)
 Contains the episodes "Survival of the Fittest" through to "Megatron Rising - Part 2"
 Volume Vier: Mission erfüllt (English: Mission Accomplished) (DVD, August 20, 2009)
 Contains the episodes "The Elite Guard" through to "Garbage In, Garbage Out"
 Volume Fünf: Der doppelte Starscream (English: The double Starscream) (DVD, October 15, 2009)
 Contains the episodes "Velocity" through to "SUV: Society of Ultimate Villainy"
 Volume Sechs: Schwarzer Freitag (English: Black Friday) (DVD, TBA 2009)
 Contains the episodes "Autoboot Camp" through to "A Bridge Too Close, Part II"

Japan 
In a press release by Takara Tomy, it was announced that starting in Fall 2010, they would be releasing the series on DVD by Paramount Home Entertainment Japan.

Video games 

Transformers Animated: The Game is the first game based on the series. Released for the Nintendo DS platform in October 2008 by Activision. 

Two arcade games, Transformers Animated: The Chase and Transformers Animated: The Shooting were released in Japan by Sega. Both games took advantage of the cards included in the Japanese releases of the toy line.

References

External links 

 Transformers: Animated at TV Aichi
 
 
 

Animated
2000s American animated television series
2007 American television series debuts
2009 American television series endings
2000s American science fiction television series
Cartoon Network franchises
Cartoon Network original programming
Television series by Cartoon Network Studios
Anime-influenced Western animated television series
Television shows adapted into video games
Television shows set in the United States
Television shows set in Detroit
Television series by Hasbro Studios
Television series created by Sam Register
English-language television shows
American children's animated action television series
American children's animated space adventure television series
American children's animated science fantasy television series
American children's animated superhero television series
Robot superheroes